The 1985 Nice International Open was a men's tennis tournament played on outdoor clay courts at the Nice Lawn Tennis Club in Nice, France, and was part of the 1985 Nabisco Grand Prix. It was the 14th edition of the tournament and was held from 9 April through 14 April 1985. Fifth-seeded Henri Leconte won the singles title.

Finals

Singles
 Henri Leconte defeated  Víctor Pecci 6–4, 6–4
 It was Leconte's first singles title of the year and the third of his career.

Doubles
 Claudio Panatta /  Pavel Složil defeated  Loïc Courteau /  Guy Forget 3–6, 6–3, 8–6

References

External links
 ITF tournament edition details

Nice International Open
1985
Nice International Open
Nice International Open
20th century in Nice